"La Paga" is a song written and performed by Colombian singer-songwriter Juanes. It's the fifth of six radio singles from his second solo studio album, Un Día Normal. "La Paga" can also be found on the compilation album 2005 Año de Exitos, which also features hit singles by Paulina Rubio, Luis Fonsi, and David Bisbal, among many other artists. The remix features rapper Taboo and occasionally will.i.am, both from The Black Eyed Peas. The remix can be found on The Black Eyed Peas album Elephunk Bonus Track Version, and Juanes albums, Mi Sangre Tour Edition (2005), Mi Sangre (2005 Double Disc Version), and Mi Sangre European Tour Edition. "La Paga" contains a sample of Buena Vista Social Club's "Candela".

Track listing
"La Paga" (Radio Edit) – 3:33 (Juan Esteban Aristizabal)

Music video
The music video is animated and directed by Jason Archer and Paul Beck. It features an anthropomorphic mouse in a human world. In the story of the video, the mouse finds that his human girlfriend is having an affair with another mouse. He goes to the bar, drinks a lot, goes to his car and crashes in the highway with a sign. At the end, he wakes up where he sees a female doctor, and the TV behind her shows his girlfriend.

Chart performance

References

2002 songs
Juanes songs
Songs written by Juanes
Spanish-language songs
Universal Music Latino singles
2003 debut singles
Song recordings produced by Gustavo Santaolalla